The Secretary of the Central Committee of the League of Communists of Bosnia and Herzegovina was the head of the League of Communists of Bosnia and Herzegovina, heading the Central Committee of the Party. The holder of the office was, for a significant period, the de facto most influential politician in the Socialist Republic of Bosnia and Herzegovina, a constituent republic of Yugoslavia. The official name of the office was changed in May 1982 from "Secretary of the Central Committee" to President of the Presidency of the Central Committee of the League of Communists of Bosnia and Herzegovina (Predsednik Predsedništva Centralnog komiteta Saveza komunista Bosne i Hercegovine).

The League of Communists of Bosnia and Herzegovina was also an organization subordinate to the federal-level League of Communists of Yugoslavia. Between December 1943 and September 1952, the former was named the Communist Party of Bosnia and Herzegovina (being part of the larger Communist Party of Yugoslavia), until both parties were renamed "League of Communists" in 1952.

Key List President of the League of Communists of Bosnia and Herzegovina 
Political parties

Here follows a list of the nine officeholders:

See also
League of Communists of Bosnia and Herzegovina
League of Communists of Yugoslavia
Socialist Republic of Bosnia and Herzegovina
Presidency of Bosnia and Herzegovina
Chairmen of the Presidency of Bosnia and Herzegovina
Chairman of the Council of Ministers of Bosnia and Herzegovina
List of presidents of the People's Assembly of Bosnia and Herzegovina
List of heads of state of Yugoslavia
Prime Minister of Yugoslavia
Politics of Bosnia and Herzegovina

References

Communism in Bosnia and Herzegovina
League of Communists of Bosnia and Herzegovina politicians